New Zealand has 44 marine reserves (as of August 2020) spread around the North, the South Island, and neighbouring islands, and on outlying island groups. They are governed by the Marine Reserves Act 1971 and administered by the Department of Conservation with assistance from the Ministry of Fisheries, New Zealand Customs and the New Zealand Defence Forces.

History 
The Marine Reserves Act was passed by the Parliament of New Zealand in 1971. In 2000 the Department of Conservation started a review of the Act resulting in a draft Marine Reserves Bill that was introduced into Parliament in June 2002, but has not yet been voted on.

The first marine reserve to be created was the Cape Rodney-Okakari Point Marine Reserve. The Poor Knights Islands Marine Reserve was established next, although with only a partial ban on fishing; a full ban was implemented in 1998. The first two marine reserves in Fiordland were established at the request of New Zealand Federation of Commercial Fishermen in 1993. An additional eight reserves were established in Fiordland on the recommendation of the Guardians of Fiordland in 2005. The Whangarei Harbour Marine Reserve was established in 2006 with the active support of the students and faculty of nearby Kamo High School.

Effects
The abundance of fish within the reserves creates spillover, or larval export, that boosts catches in neighbouring areas. In general, the reserves tend to attract a lot of recreational divers and fishermen. The divers are attracted to the abundant fish, coral, etc. inside the reserves. The fishermen are attracted to the areas just outside the reserves – where spillover creates an abundance of large game fish not found in other areas.

The Cape Rodney-Okakari Point Marine Reserve, in particular, receives more than 200,000 visitors per year. It is a popular spot for snorkelers and scuba-divers, due to the abundance and diversity of fish now living within the reserve after over 30 years of protection. Species that can be found in the reserve include Australasian snapper and New Zealand sea urchin (kina).

List of reserves

See also
Environment of New Zealand
Marine park

References

External links
 Marine reserves & other protected areas at the New Zealand Department of Conservation
 Effects of a 30-year fishing ban – NIWA
Marine reserves at Forest and Bird